Berkeley SkyDeck (SkyDeck) is a high-tech entrepreneurship startup accelerator and incubator program at the University of California, Berkeley serving as a joint venture between the Haas School of Business and Berkeley College of Engineering. Founded in 2012, SkyDeck promotes high-tech entrepreneurship in the Silicon Valley.

With Pitchbook ranking Berkeley alumni second to Stanford in producing venture capital-backed entrepreneurs, SkyDeck has become a top university incubator within the United States.

Program 
Startup companies join the Berkeley SkyDeck accelerator for six months (one university semester). Startups accepted into the highest level cohort track receive $50,000 when they join, and $50,000 three months in—a total of $100,000 to use to build their businesses. In exchange, SkyDeck takes a five percent equity in each cohort startup.

The six-month SkyDeck term finishes with a demo day when startups in the SkyDeck cohort present to hundreds of investors, seeking venture capital financing.

SkyDeck alumni startups include unicorn Lime, a transportation company with motorized scooters, electric bikes, and carsharing, and Kiwi Campus, a food-delivery service using autonomous robots.

Berkeley SkyDeck Fund 
In 2018, SkyDeck raised a $24 million, oversubscribed venture fund from investors including Sequoia Capital, Mayfield and Sierra Ventures. With this fund SkyDeck is allowed to invest up to 10 percent in each cohort startup's first funding round, up to $2 million. In 2022, SkyDeck announced it had raised $60 million, in an oversubscribed Fund II.

References

University of California, Berkeley
Business incubators of the United States
Startup accelerators
Venture capital firms of the United States
Financial services companies based in California
Companies based in Berkeley, California
Financial services companies established in 2012
2012 establishments in California